The Australian twenty-cent coin (Quinter) of the Australian decimal currency system was issued with conversion to decimal currency on 14 February 1966, replacing the florin which was worth two shillings, a tenth of a pound.

To date, four different obverse face designs have been used: from 1966 to 1984, the head of Queen Elizabeth II by Arnold Machin; from 1985 to 1998, the head by Raphael Maklouf; from 1999 to 2019, the head by Ian Rank-Broadley; and since 2019, the head by Jody Clark. The obverse has the inscription AUSTRALIA and the year-of-issue on the right hand side, and ELIZABETH II on the left hand side.

From 1966 to 1994, the design for the reverse face was Stuart Devlin's platypus. With the exception of commemorative issues, it continues to be the standard design for the reverse face.

The United Nations 20c was the first commemorative 20c coin issued for circulation in 1995. Commemorative designs had been issued for circulation previously in other denominations. 

20c coins are legal tender for amounts not exceeding $5 for any payment of a debt.

Commemorative coins

There have been various commemorative issues with following reverse face designs:
1995: 50th Anniversary of the United Nations (with the UN emblem).
2001: Commemoration for Sir Donald Bradman (1908–2001).
2001: Centenary of Australian Federation: a set of nine coins; six for the states, two for the territories and one for Norfolk Island. The designs were made by students from each of the areas.
2003: Commemorating Australia's Volunteers. "AUSTRALIA'S VOLUNTEERS - MAKING A DIFFERENCE"
2005: 60 years since the end of the Second World War, with WORLD WAR 1939-1945 COMING HOME. The design was inspired by a photo from the Australian War Memorial collection. 
2010: Centenary of the Australian Taxation Office.
2011: Wedding of HRH Prince William and Catherine Middleton: Duke and Duchess of Cambridge.
2011: Centenary of International Women's Day.
2011: 10th anniversary of the International Year of Volunteers. (IYV +10)
2013: Centenary of Canberra
2016: 50th Anniversary of decimal currency - unusually for Australian coins, this is a commemorative obverse; the reverse is as normal.

Varieties 

Excepting commemorative varieties, there have been a number of varieties of regular issue coins identified by collectors, on both the obverse and reverse faces. The first of these seen is a highly prized variety of the 1966 issue, with a "wave" on the top of the bottom stroke of the 2 in "20" on the reverse face. These coins are now sold for over $200, depending on condition. Other varieties of the reverse face generally involve the length and number of the claws of the platypus. These are prone to change if incorrect stamping pressure is used in creation of dies for the coins. Such variations are most frequently seen on coins produced at foreign mints.

For the Broadley head obverse, to date there have been several variations: 
1999 with thicker lettering. 
2000–2003 slightly reduced lettering by 0.01 mm. 
The 2004 issue had two forms: 
"the small head": a head reduced all around by 2 mm, and thicker lettering. The version was in general circulation.
"the large head": an issue identical to the 2000–03 obverse. This version was only available in mint packs though, it is rarely found in circulation.
2005 non-commemorative and subsequent issues have reverted to "the large head" obverse.
The 2005 WWII commemorative issue had an even larger head.

1981 Mintings 

In 1981, a large number of 20-cent coins were required, far more than the capacity of the Royal Australian Mint facility in Canberra, leading to some coins being minted at other facilities. The Canadian impression of the 20-cent coin is known as the "Ottawa Mint" version, which may be misleading as, post 1976, the Ottawa Mint only produced precious metal commemorative coins, like the Perth Mint, meaning the coins may have been produced at the Royal Canadian Mint's Winnipeg facilities.

Due to differences in the milling and annealing process, the Canadian variety of the 1981 20-cent coin is distinctive to attentive collectors and even cash handlers. The top and bottom edges of the milling is rounded over, not squared like the Australian and London varieties, and despite being in circulation for well over 25 years, even when well worn, the fields remain shiny, and not dulled like those produced at other mints. These qualities are also observed in Canadian coinage of similar ages.

Some of the Canadian coins were produced with a shortened first toe on the right claw. These are referred to as the " claw" variety.

Mintages
The quantity of 1981 and 1982 mintages of the 20-cent coin was sufficient to not require many coins released for circulation until 1990.

The 1983 and 1984 coins were struck for circulation with mintages of 55.11 million and 27.82 million coins respectively, but were never released for general circulation. Later they were resmelted by the Royal Australian Mint, leaving the coins relatively rare. Significant premiums have been paid for a small number of mint rolls from these years that have shown up in auctions.

The Royal Australian Mint website reports an issue of 2.7 million coins for 1985, but no 20c was minted for 1988. None were released  in 1983-84 and there were no coins minted for circulation in 1986–1993 and 1995 (Standard platypus design only)

See also

 Coins of the Australian dollar

References

External links
 Advertisement for the Decimal Transition
Twenty Cent | Royal Australian Mint
 Australian Decimal Currency
 Coins from Australia / Coin Type: Twenty Cents - Online Coin Club

Currencies introduced in 1966
Decimal coins of Australia
Twenty-cent coins